Proctacanthella is a genus of robber flies in the family Asilidae. There are about eight described species in Proctacanthella.

Species
These eight species belong to the genus Proctacanthella:
 Proctacanthella cacopiloga (Hine, 1909) i c g b
 Proctacanthella exquisita (Osten Sacken, 1887) i c g b
 Proctacanthella leucopogon g
 Proctacanthella robusta Bromley, 1951 i c g b
 Proctacanthella taina Scarbrough & Perez-Gelabert, 2006 c g
 Proctacanthella tolandi Wilcox, 1965 i c g
 Proctacanthella wilcoxi Bromley, 1935 i c g
 Proctacanthella willistoni Fisher & Wilcox, 1987 i g b
Data sources: i = ITIS, c = Catalogue of Life, g = GBIF, b = Bugguide.net

References

Further reading

 
 
 

Asilidae
Articles created by Qbugbot
Asilidae genera